Monte Cristo was a French computer game developer and publisher, based in Paris. It was established in 1995 by former Credit Suisse First Boston vice-president Jean-Marc de Fety and former Mars & Co strategy senior consultant Jean-Cristophe Marquis. The company was led by Jean-Christophe Marquis and Jérome Gastaldi since 2002. Monte Cristo declared bankruptcy in May 2010 following poor sales of Cities XL.

The first training program was followed by Wall Street Trader, which was named "best educational software" by the European Commission, among others, for its accurate simulation of international stock market conditions, and is one of the most successful games in this genre. Next, the company developed Start Up 2000, which allows players to realistically start and run their own business.

Games developed and published

References

External links 
 Monte Cristo Multimedia at MobyGames

Video game companies established in 1995
Video game companies disestablished in 2010
Defunct video game companies of France
Video game development companies
Companies based in Paris

|}